Caroline von Gomperz-Bettelheim, or C(K)aroline Bettelheim, pseudonym: Tellheim (1 June 1845, in Pest – 13 December 1925, in Vienna) was a Hungarian-Austrian court singer and member of the Royal Opera, Vienna. Her younger brother was Anton Bettelheim.

She was born at Pest (Budapest), Hungary. She studied pianoforte with Karl Goldmark, and singing with Moritz Laufer. At the age of 14, she made her début as a pianist, and two years later appeared for the first time in opera at Vienna. She eventually obtained a permanent engagement at the Royal Opera in that city. She has occasionally starred in her favorite rôles in other cities of (Germany) as well as in London. She was the wife of Julius Ritter von Gomperz, president of the Austrian chamber of commerce and member of the Upper House.

Anton Rubinstein dedicated to Gomperz-Bettelheim his composition Hecuba, Op. 92, no. 1 (aria for mezzo-soprano and orchestra).

References

External links 
 Rootsweb.com
 

1845 births
1925 deaths
Austrian untitled nobility
Austrian women pianists
Austro-Hungarian Jews
19th-century Hungarian women opera singers
Hungarian women pianists
Hungarian classical pianists
People from Pest, Hungary
19th-century classical pianists
19th-century Austrian women opera singers
Burials at Döbling Cemetery
19th-century women pianists